Graham Vaughan Lees is a publisher and founding editor-in-chief of The Scientific World Journal, which he edited until the summer of 2011. He is the owner of Corpus Alienum Oy, a Finnish publisher.

Education 
Lees obtained a PhD in Neuroscience from the University of Cambridge in 1974. Subsequently he did a postdoc at the "Laboratoire de Neurobiologie Cellulaire" on the CNRS campus in Gif-sur-Yvette, France.

Career 
As publisher, Lees worked subsequently for Elsevier (Amsterdam), Raven Press (New York), and Academic Press. His early involvement with online publishing started with the Journal of Molecular Biology. At Academic Press, Lees was vice-president the "Life and Biomedical" program and later also for the journal publishing program before leaving and setting up The ScientificWorldJournal (since 2011 published as The Scientific World Journal). He is an occasional publishing consultant for learned societies and co-edited a book on drug development. Lees was also chair of the Program Committee of the Second European Conference on Scientific Publishing in Biomedicine and Medicine which was held in September 2008 in Oslo.

References 

Finnish publishers (people)
Living people
Academic journal editors
Alumni of the University of Cambridge
English expatriates in Finland
Year of birth missing (living people)